Smestow Valley Leisure Ride is an approximately  long cycle path linking Aldersley Leisure Village in Aldersley, Wolverhampton following the route of the disused Wombourne Branchline to the disused Wombourne railway station. From Wombourne station, the route follows the Staffordshire and Worcestershire Canal back to Aldersley Leisure Village forming a circular route. Refreshments are provided at both locations. The route passes near Wightwick Manor, Bratch Locks and the Old Station Tettenhall.

References
Smestow Valley Leisure Ride

Transport in Wolverhampton
Transport in Staffordshire
Rail trails in England
Tourist attractions in Wolverhampton
Tourist attractions in Staffordshire